The Crow is a 1994 American superhero film directed by Alex Proyas, written by David J. Schow and John Shirley. It stars Brandon Lee in his final film appearance as Eric Draven, a murdered musician who is resurrected to avenge his death and that of his fiancée. The film is based on James O'Barr's comic of the same name.

Production on The Crow was struck by tragedy when Lee was fatally wounded during filming. As Lee had finished most of his scenes before his death, the film was completed through script rewrites, a stunt double, and digital effects. The Crow is dedicated to Lee and his fiancée, Eliza Hutton. After Lee's death, Paramount Pictures opted out of distributing the film and the rights were picked up by Miramax who oversaw The Crows completion. 

The Crow received positive reviews from critics, who praised its tone, visuals, Dariusz Wolski's cinematography, the production design, and Lee's performance. It also grossed $94 million worldwide, on a $23 million budget, and has gained a strong cult following. The film's success led to a media franchise that includes three sequels and a television series. The sequels, which mostly featured different characters and none of the original cast members, were unable to match the success of the first film.

Plot

On Devil's Night in Detroit, police Sergeant Albrecht surveys a crime-scene. A young woman named Shelly Webster has been raped and gravely wounded. Her fiancé, rock musician Eric Draven, was killed in the attack, having been shot and thrown from the window of their loft apartment. As he leaves for the hospital with Shelly, Albrecht meets a young girl, Sarah, who Shelly and Eric looked after. Albrecht comforts Sarah when she realizes that Shelly is going to die from her injuries.

One year later, Sarah visits Shelly and Eric's graves before meeting with Albrecht, who now helps take care of her.  A crow lands on Eric's gravestone and taps on it, resurrecting him. Upon returning to his now-derelict apartment, Eric experiences flashbacks of his murder, when a gang (T-Bird, Tin Tin, Funboy and Skank) broke in and attacked him and Shelly due to them protesting forced evictions at their apartment building. Eric also discovers that any wounds he receives heal immediately. Guided by the crow, with whom he shares a telepathic connection, Eric sets out to avenge his and Shelly's murders.

The crow helps Eric locate Tin Tin, who Eric stabs to death. Eric next travels to the pawn shop where Tin Tin had pawned Shelly's engagement ring, forcing the owner, Gideon, to return it. He blows up the shop, but spares Gideon so that he can warn the others. Eric then tracks down Funboy, who is having sex with Sarah's estranged drug addict mother, Darla. Eric kills him (making him overdose on his own morphine stash) and confronts Darla, making her realize that Sarah needs her. In the meantime Top Dollar, the crime boss who controls the street gangs in the city, and his lover/half-sister Myca have become aware of Eric's actions; they kill Gideon after he reports his attack to them.

Eric visits Albrecht, explaining who he is. Albrecht tells him that he watched Shelly suffer for thirty hours before dying. Eric touches Albrecht and feels the pain Shelly felt. Upon leaving Albrecht's apartment, Eric saves Sarah from getting run over by a car, and gives her a clue to his identity before disappearing.

Eric kidnaps T-Bird and kills him in an explosion. The next morning, Sarah and her mother begin repairing their strained relationship, and Sarah visits Eric at his apartment. Grange, Top Dollar's right-hand man, finds Eric's grave is empty. Top Dollar holds a meeting with his associates where they discuss new plans for their Devil's Night criminal activities. Eric arrives looking for Skank and a gunfight erupts; Skank is killed during the melee. Top Dollar, Myca and Grange escape and Myca hypothesizes that by killing the crow, Eric will no longer be immortal.

Eric, believing his vengeance is over, gives Sarah Shelly's engagement ring. As Sarah walks home, Grange abducts her and takes her to an abandoned church where Top Dollar and Myca are waiting. Through the crow, Eric realizes what has happened and goes to rescue her. Grange shoots and wounds the crow, sapping Eric of his immortality. Myca grabs the wounded crow, intending to take its mystical power. Albrecht arrives and assists Eric, shooting and killing Grange before being wounded by Myca. The crow escapes Myca's grip and claws her eyes out, making her fall to her death down the Church's bell tower. Eric confronts Top Dollar on the roof.  Top Dollar admits ultimate responsibility for Eric and Shelly's deaths, having ordered their murder as part of a scheme to take over their apartment building for his criminal activities. Eric grabs Top Dollar, transferring the thirty hours of pain he absorbed from Albrecht; the sensation causes Top Dollar to fall from the roof, and he is impaled on a gargoyle, killing him.

Sarah accompanies Albrecht to the hospital. Eric stumbles to the graveyard, where he is reunited with Shelly's spirit and returns to the afterlife, his revenge now complete.

Cast

 Brandon Lee as Eric Draven / The Crow
 Rochelle Davis as Sarah Mohr
 Ernie Hudson as Sergeant Daryl Albrecht
 Michael Wincott as Top Dollar
 Bai Ling as Myca
 Sofia Shinas as Shelly Webster
 Anna Levine as Darla Mohr
 David Patrick Kelly as T-Bird
 Angel David as Skank
 Laurence Mason as Tin Tin
 Michael Massee as Funboy
 Tony Todd as Grange
 Jon Polito as Gideon
 Bill Raymond as Mickey
 Marco Rodríguez as Detective Torres

Production

Brandon Lee's death

On March 31, 1993, at EUE Screen Gems Studios in Wilmington, North Carolina, Lee was filming a scene where his character, Eric, is shot after witnessing the beating and rape of his fiancée. Actor Michael Massee's character Funboy fires a .44 Magnum Smith & Wesson Model 629 revolver at Lee as he walks into the room. A scene filmed two weeks before Lee's had called for the same gun to be shown in close-up. Revolvers often use dummy cartridges fitted with bullets, but no powder or primer, during close-ups as they look more realistic than blank rounds which have no bullet. Instead of purchasing commercial dummy cartridges, the film's prop crew, hampered by time and money constraints, created their own by pulling the bullets from live rounds, dumping the powder charge but not the primer, then reinserting the bullets. Witnesses reported that two weeks before Lee's death they saw an unsupervised actor pulling the trigger on the gun while it was loaded with the powderless but primed round. Having not removed the primer, the primer could detonate with enough energy to launch a bullet and lodge it in the barrel.

In the fatal scene, which called for the revolver to be actually fired at Lee from a distance of 12–15 feet, the dummy cartridges were exchanged for blank rounds, which feature a live powder charge and primer, but no bullet, thus allowing the gun to be fired without the risk of an actual projectile. As the production company had sent the firearms specialist home early, responsibility for the guns was given to a prop assistant who was unaware of the rule for inspecting all firearms before and after any handling. Therefore, the barrel was not checked for obstructions when the time came to load it with the blank rounds. Since the bullet from the dummy round was already trapped in the barrel, this caused the .44 Magnum bullet to be fired out of the barrel with virtually the same force as if the gun had been loaded with a live round, and it struck Lee in the abdomen, mortally wounding him.

After Lee's death, the producers were faced with the decision of whether or not to continue with the film. Lee had completed most of his scenes for the film and was scheduled to shoot for only three more days. The rest of the cast and crew, except for Ernie Hudson, whose brother-in-law had just died, stayed in Wilmington. Paramount Pictures, which was initially interested in distributing The Crow theatrically (originally a direct-to-video feature), opted out of involvement due to delays in filming and some controversy over the violent content being inappropriate given Lee's death. However, Miramax picked it up with the intention of releasing it in theatres and injected a further $8 million to complete the production, taking its budget to approximately $23 million. The cast and crew then took a break for script rewrites of the flashback scenes that had yet to be completed. The script was rewritten by Walon Green, Terry Hayes, René Balcer, and Michael S. Chernuchin, adding narration and new scenes. Lee's stunt double Chad Stahelski was used as a stand-in and CGI was used to digitally superimpose Lee's face onto the head of the double. The beginning of the movie, which had not been finished, was rewritten, and the apartment scene remade using computer graphics from an earlier scene of Lee.

A character from the original comic book called Skull Cowboy was originally planned to be part of the adaptation and even had scenes filmed. He acted as a guide for Eric Draven between the worlds of the dead and the living. He was set to be played by Michael Berryman, but the role was cut from the film due to Lee's death.

O'Barr later remarked that losing Lee was like losing his fiancée all over again, and he regretted ever writing the comic in the first place.

Reception

Box office
The Crow was a sleeper hit at the box office. The film opened at number one in the United States in 1,573 theaters with $11,774,332 and averaging $7,485 per theater. Some industry sources believed that Miramax overstated the weekend gross by as much as $1 million. The film ultimately grossed $50,693,129 in the United States and Canada, and $43 million internationally, for a worldwide total of $93.7 million against its budget of $23 million. It ranked at number 24 for all films released in the US in 1994, the 24th highest-grossing film worldwide for 1994 and number 10 for R-rated films released that year.

Overseas in Europe, the film grossed £1,245,403 in the United Kingdom (where it was 18-rated), and sold 4,604,115 tickets in France, Germany, Italy and Spain. In Seoul, South Korea, it sold 83,126 tickets.

Critical response
The critical consensus states: "Filled with style and dark, lurid energy, The Crow is an action-packed visual feast that also has a soul in the performance of the late Brandon Lee." The film also has a score of 71 out of 100 on Metacritic based on 14 critics, indicating "Generally favorable reviews".

Reviewers praised the action and visual style. Rolling Stone called it a "dazzling fever dream of a movie"; Caryn James, writing for The New York Times, called it "a genre film of a high order, stylish and smooth"; and Roger Ebert called it "a stunning work of visual style". The Los Angeles Times praised the film also.

Lee's death was alleged to have a melancholic effect on viewers; Desson Howe of The Washington Post wrote that Lee "haunts every frame" and James Berardinelli called the film "a case of 'art imitating death', and that specter will always hang over The Crow". Both Berardinelli and Howe called it an appropriate epitaph to Lee, and Ebert stated that not only was this Lee's best film, but it was better than any of his father's. Critics generally thought that this would have been a breakthrough film for Lee, although Berardinelli disagreed. The changes made to the film after Lee's death were noted by reviewers, most of whom saw them as an improvement. Howe said that it had been transformed into something compelling. Berardinelli, although terming it a genre film, said that it had become more mainstream because of the changes.

The film was widely compared to other films, particularly Tim Burton's Batman movies and Ridley Scott's Blade Runner. Critics described The Crow as a darker film than the others; Ebert called it a grungier and more forbidding story than those of Batman and Blade Runner, and Todd McCarthy of Variety wrote that the generic inner city of Detroit portrayed in The Crow "makes Gotham City look like the Emerald City".

While the plot and characterization were found to be lacking, these faults were considered to be overcome by the action and visual style. The cinematography by Dariusz Wolski and the production design by Alex McDowell were also praised. The cityscape designed by McDowell and the production team was described by McCarthy as rendered imaginatively. The film's comic book origins were noted, and Ebert called it the best version of a comic book universe he had seen. McCarthy agreed, calling it "one of the most effective live-actioners ever derived from a comic strip". Critics felt that the soundtrack complemented this visual style, calling it blistering, edgy and boisterous. Graeme Revell was praised for his "moody" score; Howe said that it "drapes the story in a postmodern pall."

Negative reviews of the film were generally similar in theme to the positive ones but said that the interesting and "OK" special effects did not make up for the "superficial" plot, "badly-written" screenplay and "one-dimensional" characters.

The Crow is mentioned in Empires 2008 list of the 500 greatest movies of all time; it ranked at number 468.  It has since become a cult film.

In popular culture
Professional wrestler Sting drew inspiration from the movie for his "Crow" character.

Metalcore band Ice Nine Kills created a song based on The Crow called "A Grave Mistake", which is featured on their 2018 album The Silver Scream.

The character Dwight Schrute from the U.S. The Office says his all-time favorite movie is The Crow in season 2 episode 4 "The Fire".

In the Halloween episode of the adult animated series The Venture Bros. entitled "A Very Venture Halloween", the character Dermott Fictel (voiced by Doc Hammer) dresses up as the Crow and makes a reference to Brandon Lee's death.

Accolades

Year-end lists
 7th – Sandi Davis, The Oklahoman
 Top 10 (listed alphabetically, not ranked) – Matt Zoller Seitz, Dallas Observer
 Top 10 (listed alphabetically, not ranked) – Mike Mayo, The Roanoke Times
 Top 10 (not ranked) – Betsy Pickle, Knoxville News-Sentinel
 Top 12 worst (Alphabetically ordered, not ranked) – David Elliott, The San Diego Union-Tribune
 Top 3 "Best in-your-face exploitation" (not ranked) – Glenn Lovell, San Jose Mercury News

Awards

Soundtracks

The original soundtrack album for The Crow features songs from the film, and was a chart-topping album. It included work by The Cure (their song, "Burn", became the film's main theme), The Jesus and Mary Chain, Rage Against the Machine and Helmet, among many others. In Peter Hook's memoir Substance: Inside New Order, Hook relates that New Order were approached to provide the soundtrack for the film, with a cover of "Love Will Tear Us Apart", their hit as Joy Division, citing parallels between Eric's resurrection and New Order's formation after the suicide of Joy Division frontman Ian Curtis. However, New Order frontman Bernard Sumner declined, stating that they were too busy with their album Republic to commit to another project. James O'Barr, creator of the original comic book series, was a big fan of Joy Division and had named the characters Sergeant Albrecht and Captain Hook after bandmates Sumner (who was also known as Bernard Albrecht early in his career) and Hook.

Several groups contributed covers. Nine Inch Nails rendered Joy Division's "Dead Souls", Rollins Band covered Suicide's "Ghost Rider" and Pantera performed Poison Idea's "The Badge". The song "Big Empty" was not the Stone Temple Pilots' original choice for the soundtrack; they first recorded a version of "Only Dying", which they had recorded earlier as Mighty Joe Young in demo form, but it was replaced following Lee's death.

The bands Medicine and My Life with the Thrill Kill Kult make cameo appearances in the film on stage in the nightclub below Top Dollar's headquarters.

The score consists of original, mostly orchestral music, with some electronic and guitar elements, written for the film by Graeme Revell.

Sequels
In 1996, a sequel was released, called The Crow: City of Angels. In this film, Vincent Pérez plays Ashe Corven, who, along with his son Danny, is killed by criminals. Ashe is resurrected as a new Crow. The character of Sarah Mohr (Mia Kirshner) reappears in this film and assists Ashe. The film also features Iggy Pop, who, according to the booklet insert for the film's soundtrack, was the producer's first choice for Funboy in the first Crow movie, but he was unable to commit due to his recording schedule. The band Deftones can be seen playing live in a festival scene and they contributed the song "Teething" to the soundtrack. The film received mostly negative reviews. The film was followed by a television series and two direct-to-video sequels, each with a different person as The Crow.

The Crow: Stairway to Heaven was a 1998 Canadian television series created by Bryce Zabel and starring Mark Dacascos in the lead role as Eric Draven, originally played by Brandon Lee.

The third film, The Crow: Salvation, was released in 2000. Directed by Bharat Nalluri, it stars Eric Mabius, Kirsten Dunst, Fred Ward, Jodi Lyn O'Keefe and William Atherton. It is loosely based on Poppy Z. Brite's novel The Lazarus Heart. After its distributor cancelled the intended theatrical release due to The Crow: City of Angels negative critical reception, The Crow: Salvation was released directly to video with mixed reviews.

The fourth film, The Crow: Wicked Prayer, was released in 2005. Directed by Lance Mungia, it stars Edward Furlong, David Boreanaz, Tara Reid, Tito Ortiz, Dennis Hopper, Emmanuelle Chriqui and Danny Trejo. It was inspired by Norman Partridge's novel of the same title. It had a one-week theatrical première on June 3, 2005, at AMC Pacific Place Theatre in Seattle, Washington, before being released to video on July 19, 2005. Like the other sequels, it had a poor critical reception, and it was considered the worst of the four films.

The Crow: 2037 was a planned sequel written and scheduled to be directed by Rob Zombie in the late 1990s; however, it was never made.

Remake

On April 1, 2022, a new attempt at a remake was announced by The Hollywood Reporter, with Bill Skarsgård set to star as Draven, Rupert Sanders directing, and Edward R. Pressman and Malcolm Gray co-producing. Days later, the site also reported that FKA Twigs had been cast as Draven's fiancée. In July 2022, production on the remake was reportedly underway in Prague, Czech Republic. By August 26, 2022, Danny Huston was cast in an undisclosed role. On September 16, 2022, the film wrapped production.

Home video
The Crow was first released on VHS and LaserDisc multiple times between 1994 and 1998 in addition to the widescreen DVD on February 3, 1998. The two-disc DVD was released on March 20, 2001 as part of the Miramax/Dimension Collector's Series. On October 18, 2011, The Crow was released on Blu-ray through Lionsgate Pictures who also re-released the DVD format on August 17, 2012. In Japan, the movie was remastered in 4K for a special edition in 2016, although the film's final resolution was capped at 1080p; as of January 2023, a 4K release (digital or physical) has yet to be announced.

See also

List of film and television accidents

References

External links

 
 
 
 
 

1994 films
1994 action films
1994 fantasy films
1990s English-language films
1990s fantasy action films
1990s superhero films
1990s supernatural films
1990s vigilante films
American films about Halloween
American films about revenge
American fantasy action films
American dark fantasy films
American neo-noir films
American superhero films
American supernatural films
American vigilante films
Miramax films
Dimension Films films
Films based on American comics
Films directed by Alex Proyas
Films scored by Graeme Revell
Films set in Detroit
Films shot in North Carolina
Gothic fiction
Resurrection in film
The Crow films
1990s American films